The Arctic Railway (also Arctic Ocean Railway) is a planned railway line linking the Norwegian Arctic port of Kirkenes with the Finnish railway network.

Background
Proposals for a rail link between Lapland and northern Norway began serious consideration in 2017, with the aim of linking the Finnish railway network to Arctic shipping routes. In light of global warming making an icefree Northwest Passage a possibility within the 21st century, as well as Russia re-investing into its fleet of nuclear icebreakers replacing older ships which had plied the Arctic sea routes since Soviet times with newer models, there are widespread expectations that the Arctic ports of Murmansk, Kirkenes and Narvik will gain in importance in coming decades, thus necessitating better hinterland infrastructure. Railroads are widely regarded as the most efficient way to transport goods to and from ports and railroad access is often seen as an advantage in the competition between ports. Furthermore, improving links between Russia and Norway would allow goods travelling by land along the Eurasian Land Bridge to get from China to Norway via only one transit country (Russia) and with - depending on the gauge chosen for the Arctic Railway and the final destination in Norway - only one or two breaks of gauge. Thus problems with additional transit countries such as Iran (southern route) or Belarus/Ukraine (Central route) could be avoided.

Route options under consideration included starting at Rovaniemi or Kemijärvi to either Kirkenes or Murmansk in Russia; Kolari or Tornio to Narvik (via Sweden) or Tromsø. The Rovaniemi to Kirkenes route has been determined the most feasible, with an estimated cost of €2.9 billion. €2 billion would be covered by the Finnish government, with the remaining €900 million covered by the Norwegian government.

In early 2019, a Finnish-Norwegian working group assembled by Finland's Ministry of Transport and Communications stated that the volume of cargo was too small to justify the project's costs. After plans for the railway stalled, entrepreneur Peter Vesterbacka announced an alternative plan for the project in May 2019, claiming the railway could be built through private investments from China and the European Union, and with an underground route. As of March 2020, Vesterbacka and Chinese investors are aiming to build an undersea railway tunnel with a route between Helsinki and Tallinn.

Controversies
Environmental and cultural sensitivities exist which affect these plans, with concerns from the indigenous Sámi people that the proposed line would pass through reindeer grazing lands. Indigenous reindeer herders have criticized the plans, arguing that a railway would cut off reindeer migration paths and cause accidents, killing herds. Tiina Sanila-Aikio, the former president of the Sámi Parliament of Finland, has stated that section 17 of the Finnish constitution legally prohibits the approval of the railway, since it "assures the Sami's right to maintain and develop their own culture", which she states includes "reindeer herding, fishing and hunting in the area". In 2018, Greenpeace, Sámi youth organization , and Sámi activist and arts group Suohpanterror staged protests to block the railway's path.

See also
 Rail transport in Finland
 Rail transport in Norway

References

5 ft gauge railways in Finland
Proposed railway lines in Finland
Proposed railway lines in Norway